Teresa Tanco Cordovez de Herrera (1859 – 1946) was a  Colombian pianist and composer. She traveled to Europe with her sister in 1882 and made her Paris debut at Salle Pleyel Saint-Saens to favorable reviews. She composed for voice, sacred pieces and a zarzuela Simila similibus. She died in Bogotá.

References

1859 births
1946 deaths
19th-century classical composers
20th-century classical composers
Colombian composers
Women classical composers
20th-century women composers
19th-century women composers